Henderson Lake is a lake in the Adirondack mountains in the town of Newcomb, Essex County, New York in the United States. It was named in 1826 after David Henderson, one of the founders of the Elba Iron Works near Lake Placid, New York, and of the Upper Works at Tahawus, New York. The lake is mainly cited by cartographers as the place where the Hudson River as named officially begins, flowing out of the eastern end and outlet of the lake. Unofficially, the source of the river is traced up Indian Pass Brook and other watercourses to Lake Tear of the Clouds.

Notes

Sources
 Donaldson, Alfred Lee. "A history of the Adirondacks, volume 1". The Century Co.  New York, 1921.
 Stanne, Stephen P., Panetta, Roger G., and Forist, Brian E. "The Hudson: An Illustrated Guide to the Living River". Rutgers University Press, 1996.

Lakes of Essex County, New York
Lakes of New York (state)